Pachymatisma is a genus of sponges belonging to the family Geodiidae.

Species
Pachymatisma areolata Bowerbank, 1872
Pachymatisma bifida Burton, 1959
Pachymatisma johnstonia (Bowerbank in Johnston, 1842)
Pachymatisma monaena Lendenfeld, 1907
Pachymatisma normani Sollas, 1888

References

Tetractinellida
Taxa named by James Scott Bowerbank